The GE U25B was General Electric's first independent entry into the United States domestic road switcher diesel-electric locomotive railroad  market for heavy production road locomotives since 1936. From 1940 through 1953, GE participated in a design, production, and marketing consortium (Alco-GE) for diesel-electric locomotives with the American Locomotive Company. In 1956 the GE Universal Series of diesel locomotives was founded for the export market. The U25B was the first attempt at the domestic market since its termination of the consortium agreement with Alco.

History
The U25B (nicknamed U-Boat) was the first commercially successful domestic diesel electric road locomotive designed, built, and sold by General Electric after its split with the American Locomotive Company (Alco), a company dating back to the steam era. GE had developed internal combustion-electric generating, control, and drive systems in the early 1920s, which provided the foundation for the use of internal combustion engines in railroading.  Early applications were in motorized railcars and switch engines.  The 1930s saw that technology adapted to high speed mainline locomotives. In 1940 GE partnered with Alco, who by that time were well-established as a manufacturer of diesel switch engines and were introducing their first diesel road locomotives.  They were successful in building locomotives for switching and short-haul applications, having introduced the first road-switcher design in 1941 (which would supplant the carbody design developed by the Electro-Motive Corporation by the mid-1950s) and gained a 26% market share as of 1946. Alco-GE's efforts in main line road locomotives had not been successful at breaking into EMD's dominant position in that market, although they introduced a successful gas turbine-electric locomotive to market in 1952.  In 1953 GE went independent from Alco in locomotive production, with their new subsidiary GE Rail taking over the gas turbine-electric venture while they sought a supplier of more reliable diesel engines suitable for road locomotives.  Production of Cooper-Bessemer powered Universal Series locomotives began in 1956 and some 400 export locomotives were sold before the U25B was offered in the United States. The U25B was announced by General Electric as a domestic model on April 26, 1960. It was the first locomotive powered by GE's highly successful FDL-16 engine.

The U-Boat put GE on the road to becoming the top locomotive producer in the U.S., much to the chagrin of EMD. It introduced many innovations to the U.S. diesel locomotive market, including a pressurized car body and a centralized air processing system that provided filtered air to the engine and electrical cabinet, thus reducing maintenance.  The U25B was also the highest-horsepower four-axle diesel road locomotive in the U.S. at the time of its introduction, its contemporaries being the GP20 (2,000 hp) and the RS27. 

Though many were produced and sold, the only remaining U25B locomotives are in museums, as many were retired or scrapped at the end of their service life by the end of the 1980s.

Rebuilds
Four Southern Pacific U25Bs were rebuilt by Morrison-Knudsen with a Sulzer V-12 prime mover. These locomotives, designated M-K TE70-4S, operated from 1978 to 1987. The experiment proved unsuccessful and no additional units were rebuilt.

Preservation
Seven U25Bs are known to be preserved today. Of these, only one remains in operating condition. Southern Pacific 3100 is now on permanent exhibit at the Orange Empire Railway Museum in Perris, California. Built in 1963, this locomotive was first numbered SP 7508. Later numbered SP 6800, it became a goodwill ambassador for the railroad in 1976 when it was painted in an elaborate red, white, and blue color scheme in celebration of the nation's bicentennial; it was later renumbered and repainted in standard SP livery and was donated to the museum. The 3100 is fully certified to run on any of the nation's railroads and is frequently used as motive power for offsite work trains.

Several more examples survive, all in varying states of preservation:
Louisville and Nashville 1616 is stored at the Southern Appalachia Railway Museum in Oak Ridge, Tennessee. The unit is missing its main generator.
Milwaukee Road 5056 is preserved at the Illinois Railway Museum and is being both cosmetically and mechanically restored for operation on the museum grounds.
Milwaukee Road 5057 is being cosmetically restored by Cascade Rail Foundation to eventually be displayed at the South Cle Elum Rail Yard in Washington.
New Haven 2525 has been preserved by the Railroad Museum of New England/Naugatuck Railroad of Thomaston, CT. It wears its original New Haven colors, however it is not currently operational.
New York Central 2500 is on display at the Lake Shore Railway Historical Society museum in North East, Pennsylvania.

Original owners

References

External links
 Orange Empire Railway Museum; Southern Pacific preservation roster
 U25B Conrail photo gallery
 Cascade Rail Foundation
 Lake Shore Railway Historical Society museum

U25B
B-B locomotives
Diesel-electric locomotives of the United States
Railway locomotives introduced in 1959
Freight locomotives
Standard gauge locomotives of the United States